Val-de-Virieu is a commune in the Isère department in southeastern France. It was established on 1 January 2019 by merger of the former communes of Virieu (the seat) and Panissage.

See also
Communes of the Isère department

References

Communes of Isère
Isère communes articles needing translation from French Wikipedia